Vito Pallavicini (22 April 1924 – 16 August 2007) was an Italian lyricist.

Born in Vigevano, he wrote numerous songs, during his career for Adriano Celentano (Azzurro), Caterina Caselli (Insieme a te non ci sto più) and many others. He died at the age of 83.

References

1924 births
2007 deaths
Italian songwriters
Male songwriters
Italian lyricists
People from Vigevano
20th-century Italian musicians
20th-century Italian male musicians